Xenophon of Athens (– probably 355 or 354 BC) was a Greek military leader, philosopher, and historian, born in Athens. At the age of 30, Xenophon was elected commander of one of the biggest Greek mercenary armies of the Achaemenid Empire, the Ten Thousand, that marched on and came close to capturing Babylon in 401 BC. As the military historian Theodore Ayrault Dodge wrote, "the centuries since have devised nothing to surpass the genius of this warrior". Xenophon established precedents for many logistical operations, and was among the first to describe strategic flanking maneuvers and feints in combat.

Xenophon's Anabasis recounts his adventures with the Ten Thousand while in the service of Cyrus the Younger, Cyrus's failed campaign to claim the Persian throne from Artaxerxes II of Persia, and the return of Greek mercenaries after Cyrus's death in the Battle of Cunaxa. Anabasis is a unique first-hand, humble, and self-reflective account of a military leader's experience in antiquity. On the topic of campaigns in Asia Minor and in Babylon, Xenophon wrote Cyropaedia outlining both military and political methods used by Cyrus the Great to conquer the Neo-Babylonian Empire in 539 BC. Anabasis and Cyropaedia inspired Alexander the Great and other Greeks to conquer Babylon and the Achaemenid Empire in 331 BC.

A student and a friend of Socrates, Xenophon recounted several Socratic dialoguesSymposium, Oeconomicus, Hiero, a tribute to SocratesMemorabilia, and a chronicle of the philosopher's trial in 399 BCApology of Socrates to the Jury. Reading Xenophon's Memorabilia inspired Zeno of Citium to change his life and start the Stoic school of philosophy.

For at least two millennia, Xenophon's many talents fueled the debate of whether to place Xenophon with generals, historians or philosophers. For the majority of time in the past two millennia, Xenophon was recognized as a philosopher. Quintilian in The Orator's Education discusses the most prominent historians, orators and philosophers as examples of eloquence and recognizes Xenophon's historical work, but ultimately places Xenophon next to Plato as a philosopher. Today, Xenophon is best known for his historical works. The Hellenica continues directly from the final sentence of Thucydides' History of the Peloponnesian War covering the last seven years of the Peloponnesian War (431–404 BC) and the subsequent forty-two years (404 BC–362 BC) ending with the Second Battle of Mantinea.

Despite being born an Athenian citizen, Xenophon came to be associated with Sparta, the traditional opponent of Athens. Experience as a mercenary and a military leader, service under Spartan commanders in Ionia, Asia Minor, Persia and elsewhere, exile from Athens, and friendship with King Agesilaus II endeared Xenophon to the Spartans. Much of what is known today about the Spartan society comes from Xenophon's worksthe royal biography of the Spartan king Agesilaus and the Constitution of the Lacedaemonians.

Xenophon is recognized as one of the greatest writers of antiquity. Xenophon's works span multiple genres and are written in plain Attic Greek, which is why they have often been used in translation exercises for contemporary students of the Ancient Greek language. In the Lives and Opinions of Eminent Philosophers, Diogenes Laërtius observed that Xenophon was known as the "Attic Muse" because of the sweetness of his diction. Several centuries later, Roman philosopher and statesman Cicero described Xenophon's mastery of Greek composition in Orator with the following words: "the muses were said to speak with the voice of Xenophon". Roman orator, attorney and teacher of rhetoric Quintilian echoes Cicero in The Orator's Education saying "the Graces themselves seem to have molded his style and the goddess of persuasion sat upon his lips".

Life

Early years
Xenophon was born around 430 BC, in the deme Erchia of Athens. Xenophon's father, Gryllus, was a member of a wealthy equestrian family. Detailed accounts of events in Hellenica suggest that Xenophon personally witnessed the Return of Alcibiades in 407 BC, the Trial of the Generals in 406 BC, and the overthrow of the Thirty Tyrants in 403 BC. Detailed account of Xenophon's life starts 401 BC. Personally invited by Proxenus of Beotia (Anabasis 3.1.9), one of the captains in Cyrus's mercenary army, Xenophon sailed to Ephesus to meet Cyrus the Younger and participate in Cyrus's military campaign against Tissaphernes, the Persian satrap of Ionia. Xenophon describes his life in 401 BC and 400 BC in the memoir Anabasis.

Anabasis

The Anabasis  is a narrative of how "Xenophon rouses the despairing Greeks into action and leads them on their long march home; and the narrative of his successes has won him noteworthy if uneven admiration for over two millennia."

Expedition with Cyrus the Younger
Written years after the events it recounts, Xenophon's book Anabasis (Greek: ἀνάβασις, literally "going up") is his record of the expedition of Cyrus and the Greek mercenaries' journey home. Xenophon writes that he asked Socrates for advice on whether to go with Cyrus, and that Socrates referred him to the divinely inspired Pythia. Xenophon's query to the oracle, however, was not whether or not to accept Cyrus' invitation, but "to which of the gods he must pray and do sacrifice, so that he might best accomplish his intended journey and return in safety, with good fortune". The oracle answered his question and told him which gods to pray and sacrifice to. When Xenophon returned to Athens and told Socrates of the oracle's advice, Socrates chastised him for asking so disingenuous a question (Anabasis 3.1.5–7).

Under the pretext of fighting Tissaphernes, the Persian satrap of Ionia, Cyrus assembled a massive army composed of native Persian soldiers, but also a large number of Greeks. Prior to waging war against Artaxerxes, Cyrus proposed that the enemy was the Pisidians, and so the Greeks were unaware that they were to battle against the larger army of King Artaxerxes II (Anabasis 1.1.8–11). At Tarsus the soldiers became aware of Cyrus's plans to depose the king, and as a result, refused to continue (Anabasis 1.3.1). However, Clearchus, a Spartan general, convinced the Greeks to continue with the expedition. The army of Cyrus met the army of Artaxerxes II in the Battle of Cunaxa. Despite effective fighting by the Greeks, Cyrus was killed in the battle (Anabasis 1.8.27–1.9.1). Shortly thereafter, Clearchus was treacherously invited by Tissaphernes to a feast, where, alongside four other generals and many captains, including Xenophon's friend Proxenus, he was captured and executed (Anabasis 2.5.31–32).

Return

The mercenaries, known as the Ten Thousand, found themselves without leadership far from the sea, deep in hostile territory near the heart of Mesopotamia, with a hostile population and armies to deal with. They elected new leaders, including Xenophon himself.

Dodge says of Xenophon's generalship, "Xenophon is the father of the system of retreat, the originator of all that appertains to the science of rear-guard fighting. He reduced its management to a perfect method. More originality in tactics has come from the Anabasis than from any dozen other books. Every system of war looks to this as to the fountain-head when it comes to rearward movements, as it looks to Alexander for a pattern of resistless and intelligent advance. Necessity to Xenophon was truly the mother of invention, but the centuries since have devised nothing to surpass the genius of this warrior. No general ever possessed a grander moral ascendant over his men. None ever worked for the safety of his soldiers with greater ardor or to better effect."  
 
Xenophon and his men initially had to deal with volleys by a minor force of harassing Persian missile cavalry. Every day, these cavalry, finding no opposition from the Ten Thousand, moved cautiously closer and closer. One night, Xenophon formed a body of archers and light cavalry. When the Persian cavalry arrived the next day, now firing within several yards, Xenophon suddenly unleashed his new cavalry in a shock charge, smashing into the stunned and confused enemy, killing many and routing the rest.  Tissaphernes pursued Xenophon with a vast force, and when the Greeks reached the wide and deep Great Zab River, it seemed they were surrounded. 

However, Xenophon quickly devised a plan: all goats, cows, sheep and donkeys were slaughtered and their bodies stuffed with hay, laid across the river and sewn up and covered with dirt so as not to be slippery. This created a bridge across which Xenophon led his men before the Persians could get to them. 

That Xenophon was able to acquire the means of feeding his force in the heart of a vast empire with a hostile population was astonishing. Dodge notes, "On this retreat also was first shown the necessary, if cruel, means of arresting a pursuing enemy by the systematic devastation of the country traversed and the destruction of its villages to deprive him of food and shelter. And Xenophon is moreover the first who established in rear of the phalanx a reserve from which he could at will feed weak parts of his line. This was a superb first conception."

The Ten Thousand eventually made their way into the land of the Carduchians, a wild tribe inhabiting the mountains of modern southeastern Turkey. The Carduchians were "a fierce, war-loving race, who had never been conquered. Once the Great King had sent into their country an army of 120,000 men, to subdue them, but of all that great host not one had ever seen his home again." The Ten Thousand made their way in and were shot at with stones and arrows for several days before they reached a defile where the main Carduchian host sat. 

In the Battle of the Carduchian Defile, Xenophon had 8,000 men feint at this host and marched the other 2,000 to a pass revealed by a prisoner under the cover of a rainstorm, and "having made their way to the rear of the main pass, at daylight, under cover of the morning mist, they boldly pushed in upon the astonished Carducians. The blare of their many trumpets gave notice of their successful detour to Xenophon, as well as added to the confusion of the enemy. The main army at once joined in the attack from the valley side, and the Carducians were driven from their stronghold." 

After heavy mountain fighting in which Xenophon showed the calm and patience needed for the situation, the Greeks made their way to the northern foothills of the mountains at the Centrites River, only to find a major Persian force blocking the route north. With the Carduchians surging toward the Greek rear, Xenophon again faced the threat of total destruction in battle. 

Xenophon's scouts quickly found another ford, but the Persians moved and blocked this as well. Xenophon sent a small force back toward the other ford, causing the anxious Persians to detach a major part of their force parallel. Xenophon stormed and completely overwhelmed the force at his ford, while the Greek detachment made a forced march to this bridgehead. This was among the first attacks in depth ever made, 23 years after Delium and 30 years before Epaminondas' more famous use of it at Leuctra.

Winter by now arrived as the Greeks marched through Armenia "absolutely unprovided with clothing suitable for such weather",  inflicting more casualties than they suffered during a skillful ambush of a local satrap's force and the flanking of another force in this period. At a period when the Greeks were in desperate need of food, they decided upon attacking a wooden castle known to have had storage. The castle, however, was stationed on a hill surrounded by forest. 

Xenophon ordered small parties of his men to appear on the hill road, and when the defenders fired, one soldier would leap into the trees, and he "did this so often that at last there was quite a heap of stones lying in front of him, but he himself was untouched." Then, "the other men followed his example, and made it a sort of game, enjoying the sensation, pleasant alike to old and young, of courting danger for a moment, and then quickly escaping it. When the stones were almost exhausted, the soldiers raced one another over the exposed part of the road", storming the fortress, which, with most of the garrison now neutralized, barely put up a fight.

Soon after, Xenophon's men reached Trapezus on the coast of the Black Sea (Anabasis 4.8.22). Before their departure, the Greeks made an alliance with the locals and fought one last battle against the Colchians, vassals of the Persians, in mountainous country. Xenophon ordered his men to deploy the line extremely thin so as to overlap the enemy, keeping a strong reserve. The Colchians, seeing they were being outflanked, divided their army to check the Greek deployment, opening a gap in their line through which Xenophon rushed in his reserves, scoring a brilliant Greek victory.

They then made their way westward back to Greek territory via Chrysopolis (Anabasis 6.3.16). Once there, they helped Seuthes II make himself king of Thrace, before being recruited into the army of the Spartan general Thimbron (whom Xenophon refers to as Thibron). The Spartans were at war with Tissaphernes and Pharnabazus II, Persian satraps in Anatolia.

Filled with a plethora of originality and tactical genius, Xenophon's conduct of the retreat caused Dodge to name the Athenian knight the greatest general that preceded Alexander the Great.

Life after Anabasis 
Xenophon's Anabasis ends in 399 BC in the city of Pergamon with the arrival of the Spartan commander Thimbron. Thimbron's campaign is described in Hellenica. The level of detail with which Xenophon describes Thimbron's campaign in Hellenica suggests first hand knowledge. After capturing Teuthrania and Halisarna, the Greeks led by Thimbron lay siege to Larissa. Failing to capture Larissa, the Greeks fall back to Caria. As a result of the failed siege of Larissa, the ephors of Sparta recall Thimbron and send Dercylidas to lead the Greek army. After facing the court at Sparta, Thimbron is banished. Xenophon describes Dercylidas as a significantly more experienced commander than Thimbron.

Led by Dercylidas, Xenophon and the Greek army march to Aeolis and capture nine cities in 8 days including Larissa, Hamaxitus, and Kolonai. The Persians negotiated a temporary truce and the Greek army retired for a winter camp at Byzantium.

In 398 BC, Xenophon was likely a part of the Greek force capturing the city of Lampsacus. Also in 398, the Spartan ephors officially cleared the Ten Thousand of any previous wrongdoing (the Ten Thousand were likely a part of the investigation of Thimbron's failure at Larissa) and fully integrated the Ten Thousand into Dercylidas' army. Hellenica mentions the response of the commander of the Ten Thousand (likely Xenophon) "But men of Lacedaemon, we are the same men now as we were last year; but the commander now is one man (Dercylidas), and in the past was another (Thimbron). Therefore you are at once able to judge for yourselves the reason why we are not at fault now, although we were then."

The truce between the Greeks and the Persians was fragile and in 397 BC Dercylidas' force mirrored the movement of Tissaphernes' and Pharnabazus' force near Ephesus, but did not engage in battle. The Persian army retreated to Tralles and the Greeks to Leucophrys. Dercylidas proposed the new terms of truce to Tissaphernes and Pharnabazus and the three parties submitted the truce proposal to Sparta and the Persian king for ratification. Under Dercylidas' proposal, the Persians abandoned claims to independent Greek cities in Ionia and the Spartans withdrew the army, leaving Spartan governors in the Greek cities.

In 396 BC, the newly appointed Spartan king, Agesilaus arrived at Ephesus and assumed the command of the army from Dercylidas. Xenophon and Agesilaus likely met for the first time and Xenophon joined Agesilaus' campaign for Ionian Greece independence of 396–394. In 394 BC, Agesilaus' army returned to Greece taking the route of the Persian invasion eighty years earlier and fought in the Battle of Coronea. Athens banished Xenophon for fighting on the Spartan side.

Xenophon probably followed Agesilaus' march to Sparta in 394 BC and finished his military journey after seven years. Xenophon received an estate in Scillus where he spent the next twenty three years. In 371 BC, after the Battle of Leuctra, Elians confiscated Xenophon's estate and, according to Diogenes Laërtius, Xenophon moved to Corinth. Diogenes writes that Xenophon lived in Corinth until his death in 354 BC, at around the age of 84 or 85. Pausanias mentions Xenophon's tomb in Scillus.

Xenophon's political philosophy
Like Socrates and other students of Socrates (Plato, Alcibiades, Critias), Xenophon took a keen interest in political philosophy and his work often examines leadership.

Cyropaedia

Relations between Medes and Persians in the Cyropaedia

Xenophon wrote the Cyropaedia to outline his political and moral philosophy. He did this by endowing a fictional version of the boyhood of Cyrus the Great,  founder of the first Persian Empire, with the qualities of what Xenophon considered the ideal ruler. Historians have asked whether Xenophon's portrait of Cyrus was accurate or if Xenophon imbued Cyrus with events from Xenophon's own life. The consensus is that Cyrus's career is best outlined in the Histories of Herodotus. But Steven Hirsch writes, "Yet there are occasions when it can be confirmed from Oriental evidence that Xenophon is correct where Herodotus is wrong or lacks information. A case in point involves the ancestry of Cyrus." Herodotus contradicts Xenophon at several other points, most notably in the matter of Cyrus's relationship with the Median Kingdom. Herodotus says that Cyrus led a rebellion against his maternal grandfather, Astyages king of Media, and defeated him, thereafter (improbably) keeping Astyages in his court for the remainder of his life (Histories 1.130). The Medes were thus "reduced to subjection" (1.130) and became "slaves" (1.129) to the Persians 20 years before the capture of Babylon in 539 BC.

The Cyropaedia relates instead that Astyages died and was succeeded by his son Cyaxares II, the maternal uncle of Cyrus (1.5.2). In the initial campaign against the Lydians, Babylonians and their allies, the Medians were led by Cyaxares and the Persians by Cyrus, who was crown prince of the Persians, since his father was still alive (4.5.17).  Xenophon relates that at this time the Medes were the strongest of the kingdoms that opposed the Babylonians (1.5.2). There is an echo of this statement, verifying Xenophon and contradicting Herodotus, in the Harran Stele, a document from the court of Nabonidus. In the entry for year 14 or 15 of his reign (542–540 BC), Nabonidus speaks of his enemies as the kings of Egypt, the Medes, and the Arabs. There is no mention of the Persians,
although according to Herodotus and the current consensus the Medians had been made "slaves" of the Persians several years previously. It does not seem that Nabonidus would be completely misled about who his enemies were, or who was really in control over the Medes and Persians just one to three years before his kingdom fell to their armies.

Other archaeological evidence supporting Xenophon's picture of a confederation of Medes and Persians, rather than a subjugation of the Medes by the Persians, comes from the bas-reliefs in the stairway at Persepolis. These show no distinction in official rank or status between the Persian and Median nobility. Although Olmstead followed the consensus view that Cyrus subjugated the Medes, he nevertheless wrote, "Medes were honored equally with Persians; they were employed in high office and were chosen to lead Persian armies." A more extensive list of considerations related to the credibility of the Cyropaedia's picture of the relationship between the Medes and Persians is found on the Cyropaedia page.

Both Herodotus (1.123,214) and Xenophon (1.5.1,2,4, 8.5.20) present Cyrus as about 40 years old when his forces captured Babylon. In the Nabonidus Chronicle, there is mention of the death of the wife of the king (name not given) within a month after the capture of Babylon. It has been conjectured that this was Cyrus's first wife, which lends credibility to the Cyropaedia'''s statement (8.5.19) that Cyaxares II gave his daughter in marriage to Cyrus soon (but not immediately) after the fall of the city, with the kingdom of Media as her dowry. When Cyaxares died about two years later the Median kingdom passed peaceably to Cyrus, so that this would be the true beginning of the Medo-Persian Empire under just one monarch.

Persians as centaurs
The Cyropaedia as a whole lavishes a great deal of praise on the first Persian emperor, Cyrus the Great, on account of his virtue and leadership quality, and it was through his greatness that the Persian Empire held together. Thus this book is normally read as a positive treatise about Cyrus. However, following the lead of Leo Strauss, David Johnson suggests that there is a subtle but strong layer to the book in which Xenophon conveys criticism of not only the Persians but the Spartans and Athenians as well.

In section 4.3 of the Cyropaedia Cyrus makes clear his desire to institute cavalry. He even goes so far to say that he desires that no Persian kalokagathos ("noble and good man" literally, or simply "noble") ever be seen on foot but always on a horse, so much so that the Persians may actually seem to be centaurs (4.3.22–23). Centaurs were often thought of as creatures of ill repute,  which makes even Cyrus' own advisors wary of the label. His minister Chrysantas admires the centaurs for their dual nature, but also warns that the dual nature does not allow centaurs to fully enjoy or act as either one of their aspects in full (4.3.19–20).

In labelling Persians as centaurs through the mouth of Cyrus, Xenophon plays upon the popular post-Persian-war propagandistic paradigm of using mythological imagery to represent the Greco-Persian conflict. Examples of this include the wedding of the Lapiths, Gigantomachy, Trojan War, and Amazonomachy on the Parthenon frieze. Johnson reads even more deeply into the centaur label. He believes that the unstable dichotomy of man and horse found in a centaur is indicative of the unstable and unnatural alliance of Persian and Mede formulated by Cyrus. The Persian hardiness and austerity is combined with the luxuriousness of the Medes, two qualities that cannot coexist. He cites the regression of the Persians directly after the death of Cyrus as a result of this instability, a union made possible only through the impeccable character of Cyrus. In a further analysis of the centaur model, Cyrus is likened to a centaur such as Chiron, a noble example from an ignoble race. Thus this entire paradigm seems to be a jab at the Persians and an indication of Xenophon's general distaste for the Persians.

Against empire/monarchy

The strength of Cyrus in holding the empire together is praiseworthy according to Xenophon. However, the empire began to decline upon the death of Cyrus. By this example Xenophon sought to show that empires lacked stability and could only be maintained by a person of remarkable prowess, such as Cyrus. Cyrus is idealized greatly in the narrative. Xenophon displays Cyrus as a lofty, temperate man. This is not to say that he was not a good ruler, but he is depicted as surreal and not subject to the foibles of other men. By showing that only someone who is almost beyond human could conduct such an enterprise as empire, Xenophon indirectly censures imperial design. Thus he also reflects on the state of his own reality in an even more indirect fashion, using the example of the Persians to decry the attempts at empire made by Athens and Sparta. Although partially graced with hindsight, having written the Cyropaedia after the downfall of Athens in the Peloponnesian War, this work criticizes the Greek attempts at empire and "monarchy", dooming them to failure.

Against democracy
Another passage that Johnson cites as criticism of monarchy and empire concerns the devaluation of the homotīmoi. The manner in which this occurs seems also to be a subtle jab at democracy. Homotīmoi were highly and thoroughly educated and thus became the core of the soldiery as heavy infantry. As the name homotīmoi ("equal", or "same honours" i.e. "peers") suggests, their small band (1000 when Cyrus fought the Assyrians) shared equally in the spoils of war. However, in the face of overwhelming numbers in a campaign against the Assyrians, Cyrus armed the commoners with similar arms instead of their normal light ranged armament (Cyropaedia 2.1.9). 

Argument ensued as to how the spoils would now be split, and Cyrus enforced a meritocracy. Many homotīmoi found this unfair because their military training was no better than the commoners, only their education, and hand-to-hand combat was less a matter of skill than strength and bravery. As Johnson asserts, this passage decries imperial meritocracy and corruption, for the homotīmoi now had to ingratiate themselves to the emperor for positions and honours; from this point they were referred to as entīmoi, no longer of the "same honours" but having to be "in" to get the honour. On the other hand, the passage seems to be critical of democracy, or at least sympathetic to aristocrats within democracy, for the homotīmoi (aristocracy/oligarchs) are devalued upon the empowerment of the commoners (demos). Although empire emerges in this case, this is also a sequence of events associated with democracy. Through his dual critique of empire and democracy, Xenophon subtly relates his support of oligarchy.

Constitution of the Spartans

The Spartans wrote nothing about themselves, or if they did it is lost. Therefore, what we know about them comes exclusively from outsiders such as Xenophon. Xenophon's affinity for the Spartans is clear in the Constitution of the Spartans, as well as his penchant for oligarchy. The opening line reads:

Xenophon goes on to describe in detail the main aspects of Laconia, handing to us the most comprehensive extant analysis of the institutions of Sparta.

Old Oligarch
A short treatise on the Constitution of the Athenians exists that was once thought to be by Xenophon, but which was probably written when Xenophon was about five years old. The author, often called in English the "Old Oligarch" or Pseudo-Xenophon,  detests the democracy of Athens and the poorer classes, but he argues that the Periclean institutions are well designed for their deplorable purposes. Although the real Xenophon seems to prefer oligarchy over democracy, none of his works so ardently decry democracy as does the Constitution of the Athenians. However, this treatise makes evident that anti-democratic sentiments were extant in Athens in the late 5th century BC and were only increased after its shortcomings were exploited and made apparent during the Peloponnesian War.

Socratic works and dialogues

Xenophon's works include a selection of Socratic dialogues; these writings are completely preserved. Except for the dialogues of Plato, they are the only surviving representatives of the genre of Socratic dialogue. These works include Xenophon's Apology, Memorabilia, Symposium and Oeconomicus. The Symposium outlines the character of Socrates as he and his companions discuss what attribute they take pride in. One of the main plots of the Symposium is about the type of loving relationship (noble or base) a rich aristocrat will be able to establish with a young boy (present at the banquet alongside his own father). In Oeconomicus, Socrates explains how to manage a household. Both the Apology and the Memorabilia defend Socrates' character and teachings. The former is set during the trial of Socrates, essentially defending Socrates' loss and death, while the latter explains his moral principles and that he was not a corrupter of the youth.

Relationship with Socrates
Xenophon was a student of Socrates, and their personal relationship is evident through a conversation between the two in Xenophon's Anabasis. In his Lives of Eminent Philosophers, the Greek biographer Diogenes Laërtius (who writes many centuries later) reports how Xenophon met Socrates. "They say that Socrates met [Xenophon] in a narrow lane, and put his stick across it and prevented him from passing by, asking him where all kinds of necessary things were sold. And when he had answered him, he asked him again where men were made good and virtuous. And as he did not know, he said, 'Follow me, then, and learn.' And from this time forth, Xenophon became a follower of Socrates." Diogenes Laërtius also relates an incident "when in the battle of Delium Xenophon had fallen from his horse" and Socrates reputedly "stepped in and saved his life."

Xenophon's admiration for his teacher is clear in writings such as Symposium, Apology, and Memorabilia. Xenophon was away on his Persian campaign during the trial and death of Socrates. Nevertheless, much of Xenophon's Socratic writing, especially Apology, concerns that very trial and the defence Socrates put forward.

Socrates: Xenophon vs. Plato
Both Plato and Xenophon wrote an Apology concerning the death of Socrates. The two writers seem more concerned about answering questions that arose after the trial than about the actual charges. In particular, Xenophon and Plato are concerned with the failures of Socrates to defend himself. The Socrates that Xenophon portrayed was different from Plato's in multiple respects. Xenophon asserts that Socrates dealt with his prosecution in an exceedingly arrogant manner, or at least was perceived to have spoken arrogantly. Conversely, while not omitting it completely, Plato worked to temper that arrogance in his own Apology. Xenophon framed Socrates' defense, which both men admit was not prepared at all, not as a failure to effectively argue his side, but as striving for death even in the light of unconvincing charges. As Danzig interprets it, convincing the jury to condemn him even on unconvincing charges would be a rhetorical challenge worthy of the great persuader. Xenophon uses this interpretation as justification for Socrates' arrogant stance and conventional failure. By contrast, Plato does not go so far as to claim that Socrates actually desired death but seems to argue that Socrates was attempting to demonstrate a higher moral standard and teach a lesson. This places Socrates in a higher moral position than his prosecutors, a typical Platonic example of absolving "Socrates from blame in every conceivable way."

Historical reality
Although Xenophon claims to have been present at the Symposium, this is impossible as he was only a young boy at the date which he proposes it occurred. And again, Xenophon was not present at the trial of Socrates, having been on campaign in Anatolia and Mesopotamia. Thus he puts into the latter's mouth what he would have thought him to say. It seems that Xenophon wrote his Apology and  Memorabilia as defences of his former teacher, and to further the philosophic project, not to present a literal transcript of Socrates' response to the historical charges incurred.

Modern reception

Xenophon's standing as a political philosopher has been defended in recent times by Leo Strauss, who devoted a considerable part of his philosophic analysis to the works of Xenophon, returning to the high judgment of Xenophon as a thinker expressed by Anthony Ashley-Cooper, 3rd Earl of Shaftesbury, Michel de Montaigne, Montesquieu, Jean-Jacques Rousseau, Johann Joachim Winckelmann, Niccolò Machiavelli, Francis Bacon, John Milton, Jonathan Swift, Benjamin Franklin, and John Adams.

Xenophon's lessons on leadership have been reconsidered for their modern-day value. Jennifer O'Flannery holds that "discussions of leadership and civic virtue should include the work of Xenophon ... on public education for public service." The Cyropaedia, in outlining Cyrus as an ideal leader having mastered the qualities of "education, equality, consensus, justice and service to state," is the work that she suggests be used as a guide or example for those striving to be leaders (see mirrors for princes). The linking of moral code and education is an especially pertinent quality subscribed to Cyrus that O'Flannery believes is in line with modern perceptions of leadership.

List of works

Xenophon's entire classical corpus is extant. The following list of his works exhibits the extensive breadth of genres in which Xenophon wrote.

Historical and biographical works
 Anabasis (also: The Persian Expedition or The March Up Country or The Expedition of Cyrus): Provides an early life biography of Xenophon. Anabasis was used as a field guide by Alexander the Great during the early phases of his expedition into the Achaemenid Empire.
 Cyropaedia (also: The Education of Cyrus): Sometimes seen as the archetype of the European "mirror of princes" genre.
 Hellenica: His Hellenica is a major primary source for events in Greece from 411 to 362 BC, and is the continuation of the History of the Peloponnesian War by Thucydides, going so far as to begin with the phrase "Following these events...". The Hellenica recounts the last seven years of the Peloponnesian War, as well as its aftermath, and is a detailed and direct account (however partial to Sparta) of the history of Greece until 362 BC. 
 Agesilaus: The biography of Agesilaus II, king of Sparta and companion of Xenophon.
 Polity of the Lacedaemonians: Xenophon's history and description of the Spartan government and institutions.

Socratic works and dialogues

Defences of Socrates
 Memorabilia: Collection of Socratic dialogues serving as a defense of Socrates outside of court.
 Apology: Xenophon's defence of Socrates in court.

Other Socratic dialogues
 Oeconomicus: Socratic dialogue of a different sort, pertaining to household management and agriculture.
 Symposium: Symposic literature in which Socrates and his companions discuss what they take pride in with respect to themselves.

Tyrants
 Hiero: Dialogue about happiness between Hiero, the tyrant of Syracuse, and the lyric poet Simonides of Ceos.

Short treatises
These works were probably written by Xenophon when he was living in Scillus. His days were likely spent in relative leisure here, and he wrote these treatises about the sorts of activities he spent time on.
 On Horsemanship: Treatise on how to break, train, and care for horses.
 Hipparchikos: Outlines the duties of a cavalry officer.
 Hunting with Dogs: Treatise on the proper methods of hunting with dogs and the advantages of hunting.
 Ways and Means: Describes how Athens should deal with financial and economic crisis.

Spuria
 Constitution of the Athenians: Describes and criticizes Athenian democracy; now thought not to be by Xenophon.

See also
Arexion

References
Citations

Bibliography

 Bradley, Patrick J. "Irony and the Narrator in Xenophon's Anabasis", in Xenophon. Ed. Vivienne J. Gray. Oxford University Press, 2010.
Anderson, J.K. Xenophon. London: Duckworth, 2001 (paperback).
Buzzetti, Eric. Xenophon the Socratic Prince: The Argument of the Anabasis of Cyrus. New York: Palgrave Macmillan, 2014 (hardcover).
 Xénophon et Socrate: actes du colloque d'Aix-en-Provence (6–9 novembre 2003). Ed. par Narcy, Michel and Alonso Tordesillas. Paris: J. Vrin, 2008. 322 p. Bibliothèque d'histoire de la philosophie. Nouvelle série, .
Dodge, Theodore Ayrault. “ALEXANDER. A History of the Origin and Growth of the Art of War, from the Earliest Times to the Battle of Ipsus, b. c. 301”. Boston and New York, Houghton Mifflin Company: 1890. pp. 105–112
 Dillery, John. Xenophon and the History of His Times. London; New York: Routledge, 1995 (hardcover).
 Evans, R.L.S.  "Xenophon" in The Dictionary of Literary Biography: Greek Writers.  Ed.Ward Briggs.  Vol. 176, 1997.
 Gray, V.J. The Years 375 to 371 BC: A Case Study in the Reliability of Diodorus Siculus and Xenophon, The Classical Quarterly, Vol. 30, No. 2. (1980), pp. 306–326.
 Gray, V. J., Xenophon on Government. Cambridge Greek and Latin Classics. Cambridge University Press (2007).
 Higgins, William Edward. Xenophon the Athenian: The Problem of the Individual and the Society of the "Polis". Albany: State University of New York Press, 1977 (hardcover).
 Hirsch, Steven W. The Friendship of the Barbarians: Xenophon and the Persian Empire. Hanover; London: University Press of New England, 1985 (hardcover).
 Hutchinson, Godfrey. Xenophon and the Art of Command. London: Greenhill Books, 2000 (hardcover).
 The Long March: Xenophon and the Ten Thousand, edited by Robin Lane Fox. New Heaven, Connecticut; London: Yale University Press, 2004 (hardcover).
 Kierkegaard, Søren A. The Concept of Irony with Continual Reference to Socrates. Princeton: Princeton University Press, 1992
 Moles, J.L. "Xenophon and Callicratidas", The Journal of Hellenic Studies, Vol. 114. (1994), pp. 70–84.
 Nadon, Christopher. Xenophon's Prince: Republic and Empire in the "Cyropaedia". Berkeley; Los Angeles; London: University of California Press, 2001 (hardcover).
 
 Nussbaum, G.B. The Ten Thousand: A Study in Social Organization and Action in Xenophon's "Anabasis". (Social and Economic Commentaries on Classical Texts; 4). Leiden: E.J. Brill, 1967.
 Phillips, A.A & Willcock M.M. Xenophon & Arrian On Hunting With Hounds, contains Cynegeticus original texts, translations & commentary. Warminster: Aris & Phillips Ltd., 1999 (paperback ).
 Pomeroy, Sarah, Xenophon, Oeconomicus: A social and historical commentary, with a new English translation. Clarendon Press, 1994.
 Rahn, Peter J. "Xenophon's Developing Historiography", Transactions and Proceedings of the American Philological Association, Vol. 102. (1971), pp. 497–508.
 Rood, Tim. The Sea! The Sea!: The Shout of the Ten Thousand in the Modern Imagination. London: Duckworth Publishing, 2004 (paperback); Woodstock, New York; New York: The Overlook Press, (hardcover); 2006 (paperback).
 Strassler, Robert B., John Marincola, & David Thomas. The Landmark Xenophon's Hellenika. New York: Pantheon Books, 2009 (hardcover).
 Strauss, Leo. Xenophon's Socrates. Ithaca, New York; London: Cornell University Press, 1972 (hardcover); South Bend, Indiana: St. Augustines Press, 2004 (paperback).
 Stronk, J.P. The Ten Thousand in Thrace: An Archaeological and Historical Commentary on Xenophon's Anabasis, Books VI, iii–vi – VIII (Amsterdam Classical Monographs; 2). Amsterdam: J.C. Gieben, 1995 (hardcover).
 Usher, S. "Xenophon, Critias and Theramenes", The Journal of Hellenic Studies, Vol. 88. (1968), pp. 128–135.
 Witt, Prof. C. “The Retreat of the Ten Thousand”. Longmans, Green and Co.: 1912.
 Waterfield, Robin. Xenophon's Retreat: Greece, Persia and the End of the Golden Age. Cambridge, Massachusetts: The Belknap Press of Harvard University Press, 2006 (hardcover); London: Faber and Faber, 2006 (hardcover).
 Xenophon, Cyropaedia'', translated by Walter Miller.

External links

 
 Graham Oliver's Xenophon Homepage
 Xenophon's Education of Cyrus (Cyropaedia) Web directory
 Famous Quotes by Xenophon
 Sanders (1903) Ph D Thesis on The Cynegeticus
 Xenophon at Somni

Online works
 Works by Xenophon at Perseus Digital Library
 
 Links to English translations of Xenophon's works
 Leo Strauss' Seminar Transcripts on Xenophon (1962, 1966); and an audio recording of the entire course on Xenophon's Oeconomicus (1969) are available for reading, listening or download.
 
 
 

430s BC births
354 BC deaths
4th-century BC Greek people
4th-century BC historians
4th-century BC writers
Ancient Athenian generals
Ancient Athenian historians
Ancient Athenians
Ancient Greek generals
Ancient Greek historians
Ancient Greek mercenaries
Ancient Greek military writers
Ancient Greek political philosophers
Attic Greek writers
Classical-era Greek historians
Classical horsemanship
Greco-Persian Wars
Military personnel of the Achaemenid Empire
Ostracized Athenians
Political philosophers
Pupils of Socrates
Greek social commentators
Social philosophers
Writers on horsemanship
Memoirists
Ten Thousand-ancient mercenaries